Bangabandhu Sheikh Mujib Medical University (BSMMU) is a graduate medical university in Bangladesh. It was established in 1965. The university offers postgraduate degrees only, not offering undergraduate medical or dental degrees.

History 
Establishment of the Bangabandhu Sheikh Mujib Medical University was an upgrade of the Institute of Postgraduate Medicine and Research (IPGMR). IPGMR was established in December 1965, as a Government-controlled postgraduate institute for medical research and studies.  It was housed in the now defunct Hotel Shahbag, once the biggest hotel in Dhaka. The neighbourhood got its name Shahbag from the name of the hotel.

From 2010, many of the medical and public health colleges/institutes have become affiliated to BSMMU. For example BIRDEM, BIHS, DMC, SSMC, NICVD, NITOR and others.

It was renamed as Bangabandhu Sheikh Mujib Medical University by the Act 1, 1998 of Jatiyo Sangshad after the first President of Bangladesh, Bangabandhu Sheikh Mujibur Rahman.

Library and publications 
BSMMU has an academic library known as BSMMU Central Library, and a digital library. The university publishes a peer-reviewed medical journal, Bangabandhu Sheikh Mujib Medical University Journal.  (print). It publishes 4 issue per year.

Vice-chancellors 
The institution's top leadership, the vice-chancellor, has had ten individuals since it began in 1998:
 M. A. Quadery (30 Apr 1998 - 9 Jan 2001)
 Md. Tahir (10 Jan 2001 - 17 May 2001)
 Mahmud Hasan (18 May 2001 - 23 Nov 2001)
 M. A. Mishu (24 Nov 2001 - 21 Dec 2006)
 Md. Tahir (21 Dec 2006 - 4 Nov 2008)
 Md. Nazrul Islam (5 Nov 2008 - 24 Mar 2009)
 Pran Gopal Datta (25 Mar 2009 – 24 Mar 2012)
 Pran Gopal Datta (25 Mar 2012 – 24 Mar 2015)
 Kamrul Hasan Khan (24 March 2015 – 23 Mar 2018)
 Kanak Kanti Barua (24 March 2018 –23 March 2021)
 Md. Sharfuddin Ahmed (29 March  2021–present)

Campus 

BSMMU campus has five multiple-floor buildings which house a variety of academic, medical, and residential spaces.

Affiliated health sciences institutions
List of affiliated colleges/institutes under BSMMU:
 Armed Forces Medical Institute (AFMI), Dhaka
 Bangabandhu Sheikh Mujib Medical College, Faridpur
 Bangladesh Institute of Child Health (BICH), Dhaka
 Bangladesh Institute of Health Sciences
 Bangladesh Institute of Research & Rehabilitation in Diabetes, Endocrine & Metabolic Disorders (BIRDEM Academy), Dhaka
 Center for Medical Education (CME), Dhaka
 Chattagram Maa O Shishu Hospital Institute of Child Health, Agrabad, Chittagong
 Chattogram Medical College, Chittagong
 Comilla Medical College, Comilla
 Dhaka Dental College, Dhaka
 Dhaka Medical College, Dhaka
 Dinajpur Medical College, Dinajpur
 Enam Nursing College, Savar, Dhaka
 Faridpur Medical College, Faridpur
 Ibrahim Cardiac Hospital & Research Institute
 Institute of Child & Mother Health (ICMH), Dhaka
 Institute of Child Health & Shishu Sasthya Foundation Hospital, Dhaka
 Institute of Community Ophthalmology, Chittagong
 Ispahani Islamia Eye Institute and Hospital, Dhaka
 Khulna Medical College, Khulna
 Khwaja Yunus Ali Medical College, Sirajganj
 Kumudini Welfare Trust, Mirzapur, Tangail
 Lions Eye Institute & Hospital, Dhaka
 Mymensingh Medical College, Mymensingh
 National Institute of Advanced Nursing Education and Research, Dhaka
 National Heart Foundation Hospital & Research Institute, Dhaka
 National Institute of Cardiovascular Diseases (NICVD), Dhaka
 National Institute of Cancer Research & Hospital, Dhaka
 National Institute of Diseases of the Chest and Hospital (NIDCH), Dhaka
 National Institute of Kidney Diseases & Urology (NIKDU), Dhaka
 National Institute of Mental Health (NIMH), Dhaka
 National Institute of Neurosciences & Hospital
 National Institute of Nuclear Medicine & Allied Science, Dhaka
 National Institute of Ophthalmology (NIO), Dhaka
 National Institute of Preventive and Social Medicine (NIPSOM), Dhaka
 National Institute of Traumatology and Orthopedic Rehabilitation (NITOR), Dhaka
 National Institute of ENT, Tejgaon, Dhaka
 Rajshahi Medical College, Rajshahi
 Rangpur Medical College, Rangpur
 Shaheed Suhrawardy Medical College, Dhaka
 Shaheed Ziaur Rahman Medical College, Bogra
 Sheikh Hasina National Institute of Burn and Plastic Surgery
 Sher-e-Bangla Medical College, Barisal
 Sir Salimullah Medical College, Dhaka
 Sylhet MAG Osmani Medical College, Sylhet
 TMSS Medical College, Bogra.

Gallery

Notable alumni
 Lotay Tshering, Prime minister of Bhutan

References

External links 

 
 Bangabandhu Sheikh Mujib Medical University Journal

 Bangabandhus Bangladesh by Delwar Jahid

Educational institutions established in 1965
Health sciences schools in Bangladesh
1965 establishments in East Pakistan
Medical colleges in Bangladesh
Memorials to Sheikh Mujibur Rahman
Public Medical University of Bangladesh
Medical universities in Bangladesh